Great Bircham is the largest of the three villages that make up the civil parish of Bircham, in the west of the English county of Norfolk. The village is located about half a mile south of the village of Bircham Newton, the same distance west of the village of Bircham Tofts,12 miles north-east of the town of  King's Lynn, and  38 miles north-west of the city of Norwich.
The King's Head is a hotel and bar. In 1931 the parish had a population of 327. On 1 April 1935 the parish was abolished to form Bircham.

The villages name means 'homestead/village with newly broken ground'.

See also
Great Bircham Windmill
St Mary the Virgin's Church, Great Bircham

References

 Ordnance Survey (2002). OS Explorer Map 250 - Norfolk Coast West. .

External links

.
Information from Genuki Norfolk on Great Bircham.

Villages in Norfolk
Former civil parishes in Norfolk
King's Lynn and West Norfolk